Dogtooth or dog tooth may refer to: 

 Dogtooth (anatomy), a relatively long, pointed tooth
 Dogtooth, North Dakota, United States
 Dogtooth (film), a 2009 film directed by Yorgos Lanthimos
 Dog-tooth, an ornament found in medieval architecture
 Dogtooth spar, a mineral deposit found in limestone caves 
 Dogtooth tuna, a species of pelagic marine fish
 Dog's-tooth violet, a plant in the lily family
 Dogtooth extension, a type of leading-edge extension on the wing of an aircraft
 Dog teeth, locking features of the dog clutch in unsynchronized manual transmissions

See also
 Houndstooth, a textile pattern also known as dogtooth